Cymindis discophora is a species of ground beetle in the subfamily Harpalinae. It was described by Maximilien Chaudoir in 1873.

References

discophora
Beetles described in 1873